Kurt Hovelijnck (born 2 June 1981) is a Belgian former professional road bicycle racer, who competed as a professional between 2005 and 2013, competing for the , , Donckers Koffie-Jelly Belly and  squads.

He fractured his skull during a training accident in Belgium on 17 March 2009, but returned to racing the following February.

References

External links
 

Belgian male cyclists
Living people
1981 births
People from Eeklo
Cyclists from East Flanders
21st-century Belgian people